Little Warrior is an unincorporated community in Blount County, Alabama, United States.

History
A post office called Little Warrior was established in 1852, and remained in operation until it was discontinued in 1905.

References

Unincorporated communities in Blount County, Alabama
Unincorporated communities in Alabama